Eğriköy, Nallıhan is a village in the District of Nallıhan, Ankara Province, Turkey.

Geography
Eğriköy is 204 km far away from Ankara city and 43 km far away from Nallıhan town.

References

Villages in Nallıhan District